Callosa may stand for:

 Callosa d'En Sarrià, a town in the comarca of La Marina Baixa, in the province of Alicante, Spain
 Callosa de Segura, a town in the comarca of El Baix Segura, in the province of Alicante, Spain
 Callosa, a genus of dwarf spiders
 Callosa, a species name

See also
 Including use as a species name